The Gateway Motorway (M2 to Eight Mile Plains and M1 to Pine River) is a major tolled motorway in Brisbane, Queensland, Australia which includes the Sir Leo Hielscher Bridges (former Gateway Bridge). The motorway is operated by toll road operator Transurban.

It bypasses Brisbane in order to provide easier access between the Gold Coast and the Sunshine Coast. It runs from the M2 Logan Motorway in Drewvale (near Browns Plains) to the Gympie Arterial Road in Bald Hills. At the interchange with the Pacific Motorway at Eight Mile Plains (Pacific Motorway exit 16), its original terminus pre-1997, the route number changes from M2 (Logan Motorway – Pacific Motorway) to M1 (Pacific Motorway – Bruce Highway (Gympie Arterial Road)). The Sir Leo Hielscher Bridges are part of the Gateway Motorway and the Motorway provides access to the Port of Brisbane, Brisbane Airport and Brisbane Entertainment Centre.

Background
The motorway was constructed to connect the then-recently opened Gateway Bridge to the Bruce Highway in the north and the Pacific Motorway in the south. Construction on the road commenced in March 1985 and it was opened to traffic in four stages between August and December 1986.

Originally, the route was called the Gateway Arterial Road because the road was not at motorway status, the road passing through three large roundabouts north of the Brisbane River. Therefore, to cope with the heavy traffic, the government began upgrading the road in 1987. Duplication to four lanes and grade-separation was completed in several stages between 1989 and 1996.

In 1995, construction began on a southern extension to the Logan Motorway, creating the Southern Brisbane Bypass. The road was opened to traffic by Vaughan Johnson, then-Minister for Transport and Main Roads, on 13 May 1997. Following this work, the road was renamed Gateway Motorway.

In 2007, construction began on the Gateway Upgrade Project, which duplicated the Gateway Bridge, added a deviation between Eagle Farm and Nudgee and upgraded the motorway south of the river. The duplicate Gateway Bridge was opened on 24 May 2010 and both bridges were renamed the Sir Leo Hielscher Bridges. The original bridge was refurbished to match the new structure and was finished on 28 November 2010. The northern deviation was routed east from its old alignment (the old alignment is now named Southern Cross Way) and added a second access road, Moreton Drive, to Brisbane Airport. The deviation opened on 19 July 2009 whilst Moreton Drive opened on 3 December 2009. South of the bridges, the motorway was expanded to 9 lanes up to the Wynnum Road interchange, and 8 lanes to the Old Cleveland Road interchange. From that point the motorway is six lanes up to the Pacific Motorway Merge. The upgrades between Lytton Road and Mount Gravatt-Capalaba Road were completed on 28 January 2010, while the final stage between Mount Gravatt-Capalaba Road and Pacific Motorway (also the final stage of the entire Gateway Motorway Upgrade) was opened to traffic on 30 July 2011.

Upon its original opening, the road did not have a route number. However it gained the Metroad 1 shield in March 1994, before being replaced with M1 in 2005. Manual toll booths were removed and replaced with electronic toll gates (which require vehicles to have a transponder attached to the windscreen) in 2010.

Tolls
The motorway has three toll points, the Murrarie,  Kuraby and Compton Road toll points. The Murrarie toll point is located immediate south of the Sir Leo Hielscher Bridges and charges all vehicles travelling on the bridges. The Kuraby toll point is located north of Compton Road and charges vehicles between the Logan Road / Pacific Motorway and Compton Road / Logan Motorway. The nearby Compton Road toll point is located on the northbound exit and southbound entry ramps to/from Compton Road, which opened in 2019. The sections north of Brisbane Airport and between Port of Brisbane Motorway and Logan Road are toll-free.

The Murrarie toll point was introduced in 2005 to fund the duplication of the Sir Leo Hielscher Bridges. At the time, the Murrarie tolls were proposed to expire in 2041.

In 2011, tolls on the Gateway (Kuraby toll point) and Logan Motorways were extended from 2018 to 2051, as well as the Murrarie tolls, as a result of the transfer of Queensland Motorways' tollways to the Queensland Investment Corporation (QIC).

The motorway is operated by Transurban Queensland. The state continues to own the road and bridge infrastructure.

Construction history

 1986 - Gateway Bridge and associated approach roads (Lytton Road to Airport Drive) officially opened by QLD Premier Sir Joh Bjelke-Petersen on 11 January 1986.
 1986 - Stage 1 Gateway Arterial Road (Airport Drive to Toombul Road). Two-lane arterial road and extension of Toombul Road officially opened by Federal Minister for Transport Peter Morris on 8 August 1986.
 1986 - Stage 2 Gateway Arterial Road (Depot Road to Bruce Highway). Two-lane arterial road and connections to Deagon Deviation officially opened by Minister for Main Roads and Racing Russ Hinze on 17 October 1986.
 1986 - Stage 3 Gateway Arterial Road (South-East Freeway to Lytton Road). Two-lane arterial road including interchange at Wynnum Road officially opened by Minister for Main Roads and Racing Russ Hinze on 17 November 1986.
 1986 - Stage 4 Gateway Arterial Road (Toombul Road to Depot Road). Two-lane arterial road and extension of Bicentennial Road officially opened by Minister for Main Roads and Racing Russ Hinze on 11 December 1986.
 1989 - Airport Drive to Cannery Drain duplication. Duplication to four lanes including interchange at Airport Drive officially commissioned by Deputy Premier and Minister for Main Roads Bill Gunn on 26 July 1989.
 1990 - Mt Gravatt-Capalaba Road Interchange.
 1991 - Cannery Drain to Bicentennial Road duplication and Bulimba Viaduct duplication. Duplication of two sections to four lanes and Nudgee Road interchange concurrently commissioned by Federal Minister for Transport Bob Brown on 19 September 1991.
 1992 - Old Cleveland Road interchange. Overpass bridges officially opened by Federal Minister for Transport Bob Brown on 4 February 1992.
 1992 - Bicentennial Road to Depot Road duplication. Duplication to four lanes commissioned by Federal Minister for Transport Bob Brown on 3 December 1992.
 1993 - Bicentennial Road interchange. Overpass bridges officially opened by Federal Minister for Transport Bob Brown on 12 February 1993.
 1993 - Toombul Road interchange. Four-lane overpass bridge officially opened by MP Wayne Swan on 25 October 1993.
 1993 - Miles Platting Road to Mount Gravatt-Capalaba Road duplication. Duplication to four lanes completed in November 1993.
 1995 - Miles Platting Road interchange. Completed January 1995.
 1996 - Depot Road to Bruce Highway duplication. Duplication to four lanes and southbound Deagon Deviation overpass completed April 1996.
 1997 - Southern Brisbane Bypass (South-East Freeway-Logan Motorway). Southerly extension of Gateway Motorway officially opened by Minister for Main Roads Vaughan Johnson on 13 May 1997.
 2010 - Eight Mile Plains to Nudgee - Widening to three lanes in each direction.. Also duplicating the Gateway Bridge. Including variable speed limits.
 March 2019 - Nudgee to Bracken Ridge. Widening to three lanes in each direction. Including smart motorway technologies.
 August 2019 - Logan Enhancement Project. Widening to three lanes in each direction from Compton Road to Logan Motorway, and new south-facing ramps at Compton Road. 
 December 2020 - Heavy vehicle restrictions eased on Gateway flyover of Gympie Arterial Road.

Upgrade projects
A project to plan and construct upgrades to the Gateway Motorway and the Bruce Highway, at a cost of $2.1 billion, was in planning in July 2022 with finalisation  of business cases expected in 2023. Major components are:
 Upgrading the Gateway Motorway (Bracken Ridge to Pine River).   
 Upgrading the Bruce Highway (Gateway Motorway to Dohles Rocks Road). 
 Upgrading Gympie Arterial Road (Strathpine Road to Gateway Motorway). 
 Delivering north-facing ramps (northern connections) at Dohles Rocks Road interchange to the Bruce Highway.  
 Building the North South Urban Arterial corridor between Dohles Rocks Road and Anzac Avenue.

Interchanges
The kilometres shown below are subject to change as upgrades to the road are implemented.
The entire motorway is in the City of Brisbane local government area.

Southern Cross Way

Prior to 2010, Southern Cross Way formed part of the Gateway Motorway before the Gateway Upgrade Project constructed a shorter route (and additional Brisbane Airport access road, Moreton Drive), between those two suburbs. The old, longer motorway section was preserved, connected to the deviation and renamed Southern Cross Way, after the aircraft flown by aviator Charles Kingford Smith, to allow motorists to distinguish between the routes. Southern Cross Way (also colloquially called the 'Old Gateway Motorway') thus follows the previous alignment of the Gateway Motorway between Eagle Farm and Nudgee and has three exits.

Interchanges
The entire motorway is in the City of Brisbane local government area.

See also

 Freeways in Brisbane
 M1, Queensland
 Sir Leo Hielscher Bridges

Notes

References

Highways in Queensland
Roads in Brisbane
Highway 1 (Australia)
1986 establishments in Australia